The Falkland Islands general election of 1993 was held on Thursday 14 October 1993 to elect members to the Legislative Council. Eight Councillors were elected through universal suffrage using block voting, four from each constituency (Camp and Stanley).

It was the last election in which Desire the Right Party, one of the only political parties in the history of the Falkland Islands, fielded candidates.

Results
Candidates in bold were elected.  Candidates in italic were incumbents.

Camp constituency

Stanley constituency

References

1993 elections in South America
General election
1993
1993 elections in British Overseas Territories
October 1993 events in South America